The 2019–20 Townsville Fire season is the 19th season for the franchise in the Women's National Basketball League (WNBL).

James Cook University remain as the Fire's naming rights partner after signing a three-year extension in September 2019. 2019–20 will be the Fire's first season under new head coach, Shannon Seebohm, who overtook the role from Claudia Brassard after she spent three seasons in the position.

Roster

Standings

Results

Pre-season

Regular season

Awards

In-season

Club Awards

References

External links
Townsville Fire Official website

2019–20 WNBL season
WNBL seasons by team
2019–20 in Australian basketball
Basketball,Townsville Fire
Basketball,Townsville Fire